The 2020 Summer Olympics cauldron was made for the 2020 Summer Olympics in Tokyo, Japan. The cauldron was designed by Canadian-Japanese designer Oki Sato, who attended Waseda University, the same university as Yoshinori Sakai, the cauldron-lighter in 1964. The steps to reach the cauldron, symbolising Mount Fuji, were "designed to evoke the image of a blooming sakura flower."

Designed by Nendo founder Oki Sato, the white cauldron evokes the opening ceremony's concept of "All gather under the sun, all are equal, and all receive energy". The panels opened to reveal the Olympic torch, at the ending of the opening ceremony, and was lit by Japanese tennis player Naomi Osaka. "At the end of the opening ceremony of the Olympic Games, the cauldron 'blooms' to welcome the final torchbearer," said Nendo. "This expresses not only the sun itself, but also the energy and vitality that can be obtained from it, such as plants sprouting, flowers blooming, and hands opening wide toward the sky."

The cauldron's flame was the first at the Olympics to burn hydrogen as a fuel. The hydrogen was produced via the electrolysis of water using solar power produced at a plant in the Fukushima Prefecture. Hydrogen produced by this process is known as green hydrogen. The hydrogen burns with an invisible, colourless flame unlike propane, which has is traditionally used as a fuel in previous Olympic flames. In order to create a yellow and visible flame, sodium carbonate is sprayed. "[We] adjusted the movement and shape of the flame to shimmer like firewood was stoked; such an attempt to 'design flames' was unprecedented." said Nendo firm.

After the 2020 Summer Olympics,the true waterfront cauldron has remained in place as a reminder of the Games, as in 2016.

See also
 2008 Summer Olympics cauldron
 2010 Winter Olympics cauldron
 2012 Summer Olympics and Paralympics cauldron
 2014 Winter Olympics cauldron
 2016 Summer Olympics cauldron

References

External links

2021 establishments in Japan
Cauldron
Olympic flame
Outdoor sculptures in Japan
Sculptures in Japan